No More Love is a 1931 German musical comedy film directed by Anatole Litvak and starring Lilian Harvey, Harry Liedtke and Felix Bressart. It is based on Julius Berstl's novel Dover-Calais. It was shot at the Babelsberg Studios in Berlin and on location along the French Riviera including Nice. The film's art direction was by Werner Schlichting. A separate French-language version Calais-Dover was also released.

Cast
 Lilian Harvey as Gladys O'Halloran
 Harry Liedtke as Sandercroft
 Felix Bressart as Jean
 Margo Lion as Eine Stimmungssängerin
 Oskar Marion as Jack
 Julius Falkenstein as Dr. Baskett
 Hermann Speelmans as Tom
 Theo Lingen as Rhinelander
 Raoul Lange as Der Spanier
 Louis Brody as Der Koch
 Rina Marsa as Claire
 Konstantin Kalser as Der Schiffsjunge
 Hans Behal as Charlie
 Mischa Spoliansky as Piano Man

References

Bibliography

External links 
 

1931 films
German musical comedy films
1931 musical comedy films
1930s German-language films
Films directed by Anatole Litvak
UFA GmbH films
German multilingual films
Seafaring films
German black-and-white films
1931 multilingual films
Films shot at Babelsberg Studios
Films shot in Nice
Films set in Nice
1930s German films